Abū al-Ḥasan ʿAlī ibn al-Ḥākim (20 June 1005 – 13 June 1036), better known with his regnal name al-Ẓāhir li-Iʿzāz Dīn Allāh, was the seventh caliph of the Fatimid dynasty (1021–1036). Al-Zahir assumed the caliphate after the disappearance of his father al-Hakim bi-Amr Allah.

Reign
At the time of al-Hakim's disappearance on 14 February 1021, his sister, Sitt al-Mulk, took the reins of power. She disregarded the previous appointment of a cousin, Abd al-Rahim ibn Ilyas, as heir apparent by al-Hakim, and instead raised al-Hakim's 16-year-old son Ali to the throne. Ali received the public oath of allegiance on 28 March, with the regnal name al-Zāhir li-Iʿzāz Dīn Allāh. His rival, Abu'l-Qasim, was recalled from Damascus, where he was serving as governor, to Cairo, where he died—reportedly by suicide—a few months later. 

Until her death in February 1023, the government was conducted by  Sitt al-Mulk, who according to historian Thierry Bianquis proved "a true stateswoman". He was the first Fatimid monarch to actively shift the responsibility of governing onto his officials, inaugurating a trend that would eventually lead to the complete political impotence of the Fatimid caliphs.

Under this regime, the Fātimid state slipped into crisis - in Egypt, famine and plague led to anarchy in the years 1023–1025, and in Palestine and Syria, there was a revolt amongst the Bedouin (1024–1029). The coalition of rebels was fragmented by Fātimid diplomacy, after which General Anushtakin al-Dizbari was able to defeat it militarily.

Meanwhile, in 1028 one of the governing circle, ʻAlī ibn Ahmad Jarjarai, was able to eliminate his colleagues and take over the office of vizir, which he managed to retain until 1045. He enjoyed good relations with the Byzantine Empire, even though the suzerainty over Aleppo was constantly disputed, occasionally coming to arms. To improve relations with Byzantium and the Christian subjects of the realm, the rebuilding of the Church of the Holy Sepulchre, destroyed in 1009, was authorised under his caliphate in a treaty with the Byzantine Emperor Romanus III. Actual building work, funded by the Byzantines, was not undertaken until 1042.

Persecution of Druze 

For the next seven years, the Druze faced extreme persecution by the new caliph, al-Zahir, who wanted to eradicate the faith. This was the result of a power struggle inside of the Fatimid empire in which the Druze were viewed with suspicion because of their refusal to recognize the new caliph as their Imam. Many spies, mainly the followers of al-Darazi, joined the Unitarian movement in order to infiltrate the Druze community. The spies set about agitating trouble and soiling the reputation of the Druze. This resulted in friction with the new caliph who clashed militarily with the Druze community. The clashes ranged from Antioch to Alexandria, where tens of thousands of Druze were slaughtered by the Fatimid army, "this mass persecution known by the Druze as the period of the mihna". The largest massacre was at Antioch, where 5,000 prominent Druze were killed, followed by that of Aleppo. As a result, the faith went underground, in hope of survival, as those captured were either forced to renounce their faith or be killed. Druze survivors "were found principally in southern Lebanon and Syria". In 1038, two years after the death of al-Zahir, the Druze movement was able to resume because the new leadership that replaced him had friendly political ties with at least one prominent Druze leader.

Death and succession
The period of his Imamate was sixteen years. After ʻAlī died of the plague 13 June 1036, his son became the eighth caliph under the throne name of al-Mustansir.

See also
 Family tree of Muhammad#Family tree linking prophets to Imams 
List of Ismaili imams
List of rulers of Egypt

References

Sources

 
 

 
 
 
 

1005 births
1036 deaths
11th-century Fatimid caliphs
11th-century deaths from plague (disease)
Egyptian Ismailis
11th-century Egyptian people
Persecution of Druze by Muslims
Sons of Fatimid caliphs